Brian Crago (5 May 1926 – 14 April 1998) was an Australian equestrian. He competed at the 1956 Summer Olympics and the 1960 Summer Olympics.

References

External links
 

1926 births
1998 deaths
Australian male equestrians
Olympic equestrians of Australia
Equestrians at the 1956 Summer Olympics
Equestrians at the 1960 Summer Olympics
People from Mount Barker, South Australia
20th-century Australian people